Yury Ivanov (born 30 March 1972; died in 1995) was a Kazakhstani football player.

External links
 

1972 births
People from Aktobe
1995 deaths
Soviet footballers
Kazakhstani footballers
Association football midfielders
FC Aktobe players
FC Lada-Tolyatti players
Soviet Second League players
Soviet Second League B players
Russian Premier League players
Russian First League players
Kazakhstan Premier League players